The 2008–09 W-League was the first season of the W-League, the top Australian professional women's soccer league, since its establishment in 2008. 

The season was played over 10 rounds, followed by a finals series. Queensland Roar were crowned as Premiers for winning the home-and-away season and also Champions after defeating Canberra United 2–0 in the Grand Final.

Teams
Eight teams competed in the league.

Regular season

League table

Results

Finals series

Semi-finals

Grand Final

Leading scorers

Awards

Player of the Year: Lana Harch, Queensland Roar
Goalkeeper of the Year: Melissa Barbieri, Melbourne Victory
Golden Boot: Leena Khamis, Sydney FC – 7 goals
Goal of the Year: Marianna Tabain, Perth Glory – Round 9, Adelaide United v Perth Glory
Fair Play Award: Queensland Roar
Coach of the Year: Jeff Hopkins, Queensland Roar

See also

 Adelaide United W-League season 2008-09
 Queensland Roar W-League season 2008-09
 Canberra United W-League season 2008-09
 Central Coast Mariners W-League season 2008-09
 Melbourne Victory FC W-League season 2008-09
 Newcastle Jets W-League season 2008-09
 Perth Glory W-League season 2008-09
 Sydney FC W-League season 2008-09

References

 
Aus
2008
1